Dave Cropper (26 December 1945 – 3 December 2016) was a British middle-distance runner. He competed in the 800 metres at the 1968 Summer Olympics and the 1972 Summer Olympics.

References

1945 births
2016 deaths
Athletes (track and field) at the 1968 Summer Olympics
Athletes (track and field) at the 1972 Summer Olympics
British male middle-distance runners
Olympic athletes of Great Britain
Place of birth missing